Brian Sawyer (born 28 January 1938) is an English former professional footballer who played as a centre forward.

Career
Born in Rawmarsh, Sawyer played for Barnsley, Rotherham United, Bradford City and Buxton.

References

1938 births
Living people
English footballers
Barnsley F.C. players
Rotherham United F.C. players
Bradford City A.F.C. players
Buxton F.C. players
English Football League players
Association football forwards